CTV may refer to:

Television
 Connected TV, or Smart TV, a TV set with integrated internet

North America and South America 
 CTV Television Network, a Canadian television network owned by Bell Media
 CTV 2, a secondary Canadian television network owned by Bell Media 
CTV Atlantic, a system of four television stations in the Canadian Maritime provinces
 CTV Comedy Channel
 CTV Drama Channel
 CTVglobemedia, now owned by Canadian telecom giant Bell Canada as Bell Media
 CTV Life Channel
 CTV News
 CTV News Channel (Canadian TV channel)
 CTV Sci-Fi Channel
 C TV, a Trinidad and Tobago broadcast television station
 Citizens Television, an American public access network in Connecticut
 CTV: The Comedy Network, former name of Comedy Central, an American television channel

Asia 
 China Television, a Taiwanese television company, established 1968
 CTV Main Channel
 CTV News Channel (Taiwan)
 CTV Classic
 CTV (Japan) or Chūkyō Television Broadcasting, a television station in Nagoya, Japan
 Commercial Television (Hong Kong TV station), a defunct television station in Hong Kong
 CTV Banten, a television station in Indonesia

Europe 
 ITV Channel Television, an ITV region for the Channel Islands
 CTV (Bath), the University of Bath's student television station, "Campus TV"
 CTV (pay television), a defunct analogue satellite television platform in Scandinavia
 Vatican Television Center (Centro Televisivo Vaticano), the Vatican's TV channel
 ČTV, a former channel of Česká televize, Czech Republic

Africa 
 CTV (Egyptian TV channel), the official Coptic Orthodox TV station broadcasting in Arabic
 Cape Town TV, a South African television station

Australasia 
 Canterbury Television, a New Zealand television station
 CTV Building, a building that collapsed during the 2011 Christchurch earthquake
 CTV 41 Bendigo, a former Australian community television station in Bendigo

Other uses
 Citrus tristeza virus, a viral species that causes disease in citrus plants
 Combat Tactical Vehicle (Technology Demonstrator)
 Confederación de Trabajadores de Venezuela, a federation of labor unions in Venezuela
 Corpo Truppe Volontarie, the Italian expeditionary force in the Spanish Civil War
 Gorgon (missile family), CTV-4 and CTV-₰6

See also
 CCTV (disambiguation)
 CTV Building (disambiguation)
 Color television
 ITV Central (previously Central Independent Television), an ITV region for the English West Midlands